Killer bee refers to a hybrid of the African honey bee with various European honey bees.

Killer bees or Killer B's may also refer to:

Film and television
 Killer Bees (1974 film), a television movie featuring Gloria Swanson
 Killer Bees! (2002 film), a television movie featuring Fiona Loewi
 Killer Bees (2008 film) (Die Bienen — Tödliche Bedrohung), a German horror film
 Killer Bees (2017 film), an American documentary film
 Killer Bee (Naruto), a fictional character in the anime and manga series Naruto
 The Killer Bees (SNL), a recurring sketch on the American comedy program Saturday Night Live
 The Killer Bees (Ned's Declassified School Survival Guide characters), fictional characters in the TV series Ned's Declassified School Survival Guide

Music
 Killer Bee (band), a Swedish-Canadian rock band formed by Anders Rönnblom and Brian Frank
 Wu-Tang Killa Beez, a collective nickname for affiliates of the Wu-Tang Clan rap group
 The Killer Bees, an American funk/soul/rock band co-founded by Papa Mali
 WXKB, a Top 40 music radio station in Cape Coral, Florida nicknamed "The Killer B"
 DXKB, a Philippine radio station, formerly nicknamed "Killer Bee"

Sports
 Bridgehampton School, nickname of high school basketball team featured in 2017 film documentary.
 The Killer Bees (professional wrestling), a professional wrestling tag team
 Killer B's (Houston Astros), collective nickname for six Houston Astros players in the 1990s and early 2000s
 Killer B's (Miami), collective nickname for eight Miami Dolphins defensive players in the 1980s
 Rio Grande Valley Killer Bees (NAHL), a former North American Hockey League team based in Hidalgo, Texas, US
 Rio Grande Valley Killer Bees (CHL), a former Central Hockey League team based in Hidalgo, Texas, US
 Group B, a 1980s class of World Rally Championship cars nicknamed "Killer B's" due to their poor safety record
 The Killer B's, a nickname for three players for the 2013–2017 Pittsburgh Steelers: Ben Roethlisberger, Antonio Brown, and Le'Veon Bell

Video games
 Killer Bees!, a 1983 video game for the Magnavox Odyssey2
 Cammy, a character in the Street Fighter video-game series sometimes called Killer Bee

Other uses
 Killer bees (business), firms or individuals employed by a target company to fend off a takeover bid
 Killer Bees (Texas Senate), a group of Texas senators, including Glenn Kothmann, who in 1979 went into hiding to prevent a quorum
 Killer Beez, a gang in New Zealand

See also
 Killer Beaz (born 1953), American stand-up comedian
 Swift KillerBee, a type of unmanned aerial vehicle
 Killer Tweeker Bees, 1997 album by American guitarist Greg Ginn